The Parish Church of St Andrew, Finghall, is the parish church for the village of Finghall in North Yorkshire, England. The building is located on the site of a much earlier Anglo-Saxon church and has some remnants of that era incorporated into the building, though the present structure dates back to the 12th century. The building is now a grade II* listed structure and is still used for worship.

History
The Church of St Andrew, Finghall, was built in the Early English style in the late 12th century and is now grade II* listed. It has a tower to the west with a nave, chancel and a rare double bell holder (bell-cot) situated on the centre of the church roof. The roof is described as being very low, with one writer stating that "[it comes] nearly to the ground," and whilst one bell is undated, the other shows it to have been cast in 1620. Some elements are thought to be Anglo-Saxon in nature, including a blocked doorway into the nave dated to around 1140 and an Anglo-Saxon cross-head from the 9th century which is built into the chancel. The church was rebuilt in the 14th century and smaller additions were made in the 18th and 19th centuries with a complete restoration in 1904. Further restorations were undertaken in 1959 and 1964.

The most recent restoration was in the year 2000 when the commandment boards were restored. The commandment boards were instituted by Queen Elizabeth I in the 16th century, but Finghall didn't get theirs until the middle of the 18th century.

In 1801, the Reverend Luke Yarker employed several people as musicians and singers in the church. The musicians were supplanted in 1865 by a harmonium, which was replaced in 1894 by an organ that had previously been in Constable Burton Hall.

The church is sited next to Leeming Beck (named Bedale Beck further down the valley) and was formerly in an Anglo-Saxon village. This had led historians to label such places of worship as 'Plague Churches'.

The church was patronised by the Fitzhugh and the Wyvill families and the site is believed to have been the meeting of a church Synod in the year 768. Other notable families were patrons of the church and were afforded the right of advowson. The Scrope family lost this right in 1415 when their lands were confiscated (including Finghall church) by the crown on account of Henry Scrope's involvement in the 1415 plot to murder King Henry V. Scrope was executed at Southampton for this.

Two of the graves in the churchyard belong to military airmen. One is of a Royal Flying Corps airman who was the only son of the vicar at Finghall at that time. E.H.G. Sharples died in January 1918 in a training accident. The other grave is from the Second World War and holds the remains of Flying Officer N.J.M. Barry.

The church is in a Benefice with five other churches; St Gregory's (Crakehall), St Mary's (Hornby), St Michael's (Spennithorne), St Oswald's (Hauxwell), and St Patrick's (Patrick Brompton). Together, these six churches are collectively known as Lower Wensleydale.

Vicars at Finghall
Below is a list of rectors from Finghall. At some point in the late twentieth century, the incumbent at Patrick Brompton became the vicar for the extended parish.

John de Segbrook - 1368
 Will Lyllforth
 Will Foxholes - 1420
 Roger Parker - 1457
 John Taylor
 Peter Conder
 William Typping - 1541
 Lacell Routh - 1572
 Reginald Lancaster - 1587
 Matthew Levett - 1622
 Henry Paget
 Robert Smith - 1665
 Henry Raper - 1710
 Thomas Nelson - 1735
 Luke Yarker - 1776
 Nicholas Bourne - 1803
 Edward Wyvill - 1820
 George Henry Ray - 1869
 Henry Milner Sharples - 1893
 Walter Hawkesworth Fawkes - 1920 (held in plurality with the parish of East Hauxwell)
 John William de la Poer Beresford-Peirse - 1944
 Demetrius Thomas Reynolds Carlin - 1947
 Joseph Nicholls Jory - 1954
 Benjamin William Crawford - 1971
 William Frederick Greatham - 1975
 Raymond Joseph Pearson - 1982
 David James Christie - 1995
 William John Hulse - 2002
 Bryan Stanley Dixon - 2012 (Held in plurality with the parishes of Patrick Brompton, Hornby & Crakehall)
 Robin David Christopher Lawton - 2017

Notes

References

Sources

External links

Parish map in 1850

Grade II* listed churches in North Yorkshire
Wensleydale
Finghall